

427001–427100 

|-bgcolor=#f2f2f2
| colspan=4 align=center | 
|}

427101–427200 

|-bgcolor=#f2f2f2
| colspan=4 align=center | 
|}

427201–427300 

|-bgcolor=#f2f2f2
| colspan=4 align=center | 
|}

427301–427400 

|-bgcolor=#f2f2f2
| colspan=4 align=center | 
|}

427401–427500 

|-bgcolor=#f2f2f2
| colspan=4 align=center | 
|}

427501–427600 

|-bgcolor=#f2f2f2
| colspan=4 align=center | 
|}

427601–427700 

|-id=695
| 427695 Johnpazder ||  || John Pazder (born 1967) of the National Research Council of Canada, who is the team leader of the optics group of the Herzberg Institute of Astrophysics and optical engineer for the Thirty Meter Telescope project || 
|}

427701–427800 

|-bgcolor=#f2f2f2
| colspan=4 align=center | 
|}

427801–427900 

|-bgcolor=#f2f2f2
| colspan=4 align=center | 
|}

427901–428000 

|-bgcolor=#f2f2f2
| colspan=4 align=center | 
|}

References 

427001-428000